Christopher Bronk Ramsey is a British physicist, mathematician and specialist in radiocarbon dating. He is a professor at the University of Oxford and is the incumbent Director of the Oxford Radiocarbon Accelerator Unit (ORAU), a post he has held since 2003. He is a member of Merton College, Oxford and a Bodley Fellow. His doctorate, completed in 1987, included the first successful implementation of carbon dioxide gas as a target for radiocarbon dating via accelerator mass spectrometry.

In the early 1990s, Bronk Ramsey became interested in the application of Bayesian statistics to the analysis of radiocarbon data. In 1994, he authored OxCal, an online radiocarbon calibration program.
Bronk Ramsey has made significant contributions to various chronological issues, including the Minoan eruption of Thera, the British Neolithic, the dispersal of modern humans out of Africa and the Egyptian chronology.
 His research interests also include the improvement of the radiocarbon calibration record. He is a member of the International Calibration (IntCal) group. His recent work has focused on improving the radiocarbon calibration record and synthesizing radiocarbon data with other chronometric information. In October 2012, Bronk Ramsey published the first wholly terrestrial radiocarbon calibration record extending back to the limit of the technique.

Selected publications

References

External links
 Oxford Radiocarbon Accelerator Unit
 OxCal Program
 Research Laboratory for Archaeology & the History of Art

Fellows of Merton College, Oxford
British physicists